The 2012 Individual Speedway European Championship was won by Aleš Dryml, Jr. from Czech Republic

Classification 

2012 in European sport
2012 in speedway
Speedway European Championship